Khwopa College was established in 2001 by people of Bhaktapur in aiming to provide quality education to general people with affordable fee. It has been undertaken by Bhaktapur Municipality, a local government of Nepal, since its establishment.

Bhaktapur Municipality has eight educational institutions: Khwopa Engineering College, Khwopa College of Engineering, Khwopa College, Khwopa Secondary School, and Khwopa Polytechnical Institute, Sharada College, Sharada Secondary School, and Khwopa College of Law. 

Khwopa College is affiliated with Tribhuvan University of Nepal. It provides undergraduate and graduate level of education. It runs three major faculties — Science, Management and Humanities. At Khwopa College different Bachelors and Masters programs are running under the affiliation of Tribhuvan University.

Courses offered:
 BBM (Bachelor of Business Management) since 2018
 BA (Bachelor of Arts) since 2005
 BBS (Bachelor of Business Studies) since 2001
 B.Sc.(Environmental Science) since 2001
 B.Sc. (Physics/Chemistry/Math) PCM since 2005
 B.Sc. (Physics/Statistics/Math) PCM since 2006
 M.A (Master of Arts) in Economics since 2008
 M.A (Master of Arts) in English since 2007
 MBS (Master in Business Studies) since 2006
 M.Sc. (Environmental Science) since 2005

The management committee is chaired by Sunil Prajapati, Mayor of Bhaktapur Municipality; and the Principal is Roopak Joshi.
Program Directors are as Follows:
 BBM (Bachelor of Business Management) since 2018- Sunil Suwal
 BA (Bachelor of Arts)/M.A (Master of Arts since 2005- Kaminika Nyaichyai
 BBS (Bachelor of Business Studies) since 2001- Rajesh Kumar Shrestha
 B.Sc.(Environmental Science) since 2001,M.Sc. (Environmental Science) since 2005

Journal
Khwopa Journal (KJOUR) is a multidisciplinary journal published by the Research Management Cell of Khwopa College.

Conference

Khwopa College organized Second National Conference on Role of Management in Economic Development from June 12-13, 2022.

External links
 

Educational institutions established in 2001
Universities and colleges in Nepal
Tribhuvan University
2001 establishments in Nepal